Cho Kwang-rae (born March 19, 1954) is a former South Korean football player and manager. He is the current executive director of Daegu FC.

International career
Cho was selected for the university students' national team for the 1976 World University Football Championship in Uruguay. South Korea advanced to the final after defeating Brazil, Chile and the Netherlands in the championship. In the final against Paraguay, he won a crucial penalty, and Paraguay gave up the match after two Paraguayan players who didn't accept the judgement were sent off for hitting the referee.

Cho played for the senior national team in the 1986 FIFA World Cup. Cho contributed to South Korea's draw by providing an assist against Bulgaria, but he scored a fatal own goal in the last match that South Korea lost 3–2 to Italy.

In the 1986 Asian Games, Cho consecutively scored team's first goals in the semi-finals and the final. South Korea won a gold medal in the tournament and Cho selected the final match against Saudi Arabia as the best match in his international career.

Style of play
Cho is regarded as one of the greatest South Korean central midfielders of all time. Nicknamed the "Computer Linker", Cho showed accurate passing skill and intelligent decision just like a computer calculated.

Career statistics

International
 

Results list South Korea's goal tally first.

Honours

Player 
Yonsei University
Korean National Championship runner-up: 1974

ROK Army
Korean Semi-professional League (Spring): 1980
Korean President's Cup runner-up: 1980

Daewoo Royals
K League 1: 1984, 1987
Korean League Cup runner-up: 1986
Asian Club Championship: 1985–86

South Korea B
FISU World University Championships: 1976

South Korea
Asian Games: 1978, 1986
AFC Asian Cup runner-up: 1980

Individual
Korean FA Best XI: 1977, 1978, 1979, 1980, 1981, 1983, 1985, 1986
Korean FA Player of the Year: 1981
K League 1 Best XI: 1983

Manager
Anyang LG Cheetahs
K League 1: 2000
Korean League Cup runner-up: 1999
Korean Super Cup: 2001
Asian Club Championship runner-up: 2001–02

Gyeongnam FC
Korean FA Cup runner-up: 2008

South Korea
AFC Asian Cup third place: 2011

Individual
K League 1 Manager of the Year: 2000

References

External links
 
 
 

1954 births
Living people
Association football midfielders
South Korean footballers
South Korea international footballers
South Korean football managers
K League 1 players
Pohang Steelers players
Busan IPark players
Busan IPark managers
FC Seoul managers
Gyeongnam FC managers
K League 1 managers
1980 AFC Asian Cup players
1986 FIFA World Cup players
2011 AFC Asian Cup managers
People from Jinju
Yonsei University alumni
Asian Games medalists in football
Footballers at the 1978 Asian Games
Footballers at the 1986 Asian Games
Haman Jo clan
Asian Games gold medalists for South Korea
Medalists at the 1978 Asian Games
Medalists at the 1986 Asian Games
Sportspeople from South Gyeongsang Province